The discography of English indie rock band Hard-Fi comprises three studio albums, one live album, one compilation album, one remix album, one extended play and 11 singles.

Albums

Studio albums

Compilation album

Live albums

Extended plays

Singles

Other appearances
Notes:
The following songs were not released on studio albums or singles by Hard-Fi at the time of release.
"Help Me Please" on Help!: A Day in the Life is slightly different from the version on Once Upon a Time in the West.

References

External links
Hard-Fi discography
"Music Charts: "Hard-Fi"

Hard-Fi
Discographies of British artists
Rock music group discographies